Balvinder Sopal (born 4 December 1979) is an British actress. Having previously made appearances in British soap operas including Emmerdale, Coronation Street, Doctors and Hollyoaks, she has portrayed the role of Suki Panesar in the BBC soap opera EastEnders consistently since January 2020.

Career
Sopal made her professional acting debut as Bhelua in The Beautiful Violin at Oldham Coliseum Theatre in 2001. She then went on to appear in stage productions such as Absent Friends, Relatively Speaking and The Tales of the Harrow. Sopal made her onscreen debut in a 2001 episode of the BBC series Kidhaar! as Reena directed by Kate Rowland. In 2008, she appeared in the BBC film White Girl as Fatima. 

From 2009 to 2018, Sopal made numerous appearances in four British soap operas; Emmerdale, Coronation Street, Doctors and Hollyoaks. In December 2019, Sopal was cast in her first regular role in the BBC soap opera EastEnders as Suki Panesar. Her first scene aired on 27 January 2020.

Filmography

Stage

Awards and nominations

References

External links
 

1979 births 
Living people 
21st-century English actresses
Actresses from Huddersfield
British actresses of Indian descent
English film actresses
English radio actresses
English soap opera actresses
English stage actresses